Krivtsovo is a rural locality (a selo) and the administrative center of Krivtsovskoye Rural Settlement, Yakovlevsky District, Belgorod Oblast, Russia. The population was 602 as of 2010. There are 16 streets.

Geography 
Krivtsovo is located 26 km east of Stroitel (the district's administrative centre) by road. Sazhnoye is the nearest rural locality.

References 

Rural localities in Yakovlevsky District, Belgorod Oblast
Korochansky Uyezd